is a Japanese actress, fashion model and gravure idol. She is represented by the agency Asia Promotion.

Biography
In 2014, Kawazu won the title of Miss Seventeen 2014 and first started her career as an exclusive model for the Japanese Seventeen magazine.

She made her acting debut in the 2016 live-action film Defying Kurosaki-kun.

She starred as the female lead in the 2020 tokusatsu drama Kamen Rider Saber.

Filmography

Films

Television series

Web series

References

External links
Asuka Kawazu official profile at Asia Promotion 

2000 births
21st-century Japanese actresses
Living people